In recent years, several incidents of apparent racism have occurred at the University of Ottawa, located in Ottawa, Ontario, Canada. Some students and staff members have labelled these incidents as racism.

Black student handcuffed on campus (2020) 
In mid-June of 2020, a Black male student was carded and detained for two hours. This student was later identified as Jamal Boyce, the vice president of the student's association in his program.

Reports state that Boyce was skateboarding. Campus security stopped him and demanded his identification. When he was unable to provide any, they arrested him. Witnesses at the scene felt that security detained Boyce for no reason. Skateboarding on campus is a common activity for students of all races. Multiple witnesses in the crowd questioned  why Boyce was being held against his will.

More than a dozen student organizations, including the University of Ottawa Students' Union, authored an open letter saying that the university's response to the incident was insufficient in addressing systemic racism. Various staff members also voiced their support, backing the demands of the student groups. University staff members expected the University of Ottawa to implement student demands, which included an apology to Boyce, carding policy review, training for staff and security members, and transparency to further protect student rights.

Racist comments made during an online class (2020) 
In September 2020, students noted that racist slurs were used during a virtual class. At the time, all classes were offered virtually due to the rising number of COVID-19 cases in Canada.

The incident occurred without a professor present. Dodek stated that the academia, including the University of Ottawa's law school, had a long history of systemic discriminatory practices, which must be addressed urgently.

N-word used in class (2020) 
In October 2020, a part-time University of Ottawa Professor, Verushka Lieutenant-Duval, was suspended after she said the N-word - an extremely offensive racial slur -  during one of her lectures. A student who attended this lecture filed a complaint to the University of Ottawa's president, Jacques Frémont, and demanded an immediate assessment of the situation. Other students present in the class also supported this complaint. The students from various faculties at the university supported demands for punitive action as the news of the incident made its way to the headlines.

Response 
In October 2020, 34 professors at the university signed a letter in support of Verushka Lieutenant-Duval. Many students at the university were outraged and condemned the letter. The letter defended Lieutenant-Duval's actions, stating that it was vital the university continues to abolish all forms of systemic racism while ensuring that the transmission of knowledge and academic freedom is still protected. The students' union voiced its frustration, claiming that while these 34 professors responded swiftly in defense of their colleague Lieutenant-Duval, they are often silent when asked to express their support for BIPOC students at the University of Ottawa.

References 

University of Ottawa
Anti-black racism in Canada